Menora may refer to:

Menora (dance), a Siamese folk dance
Menora (planthopper), a flatid planthopper in family Flatidae
Menora, Western Australia, a suburb of Perth
Kfar HaOranim, an Israeli settlement in the West Bank also known as Menora

See also 
Menorah (disambiguation)